Eagle Center is an unincorporated community in Black Hawk County, Iowa, United States.

History
Eagle Center's population was 63 in 1902.

References

Unincorporated communities in Black Hawk County, Iowa
Unincorporated communities in Iowa